HMS Gladiolus was a  of the Royal Navy, the first ship of her class.

She was laid down at Smiths Dock Company on the River Tees on 19 October 1939, launched on 24 January 1940, and commissioned on 6 April 1940.
Gladiolus was active in the Battle of the Atlantic in World War II and spent most of her service career on convoy escort duty in the North Atlantic. She was lost in action on 16 October 1941.

Service history
After commissioning and working up, Gladiolus was assigned to the Western Approaches Escort Force.
In her 18 months of service she escorted over 40 convoys, of which over a dozen were attacked; Gladiolus was involved in four major convoy battles, and participated destroying three U-boats.

She was engaged in all the duties performed by corvettes; escorting convoys, searching for and attacking U-boats which attacked ships in convoy, and rescuing survivors.

Gladiolus was involved in the sinking of the Type I U-boat  on 1 July 1940.  This was the first U-boat kill by a corvette. U-26 had been heavily damaged by eight depth charges from Gladiolus, as well as bombs from a Short Sunderland aircraft, and subsequently scuttled herself.

As one of the early Flowers Gladiolus suffered from the drawbacks of her type; a short forecastle, merchant type bridge, and poor habitability. In October 1940 she went into dock for remedial work and was re-fitted with a longer foc’s’le to improve her habitability. This necessitated ballasting, to avoid pitch problems, and a tilt test, to check stability.

In April 1941 Gladiolus involved in the battle for HX 121.
Douglas also gained a contact and made an attack, but saw no result. Later that day she sighted a U-boat on the surface and attacked, being rewarded with a gush of air bubbles and wreckage. Gladiolus was credited with destroying , but post-war re-evaluation found no U-boat attacked that day, and attributed U-65s destruction to the attack by Douglas the previous day.

In June 1941 HX 133 came under attack; Gladiolus was detached from escorting OB 335 to join as reinforcement.
On 24/25 June, after midnight, she sighted , and attacked. She attempted to ram, but slowed to avoid major damage, and U-71 dived away. U-71 was severely damaged, and surfaced to try to escape on the surface; Gladiolus and Nasturtium opened fire, scoring hits on U-71s conning tower. Gladiolus claimed a kill for this, and was credited with sinking U-71, but the boat escaped to base. On 26/27 June in early hours,  attacked the convoy, and was sighted by Nasturtium. Altogether the three corvettes launched 50 depth charges; U-556 was forced to the surface as Gladiolus dropped a further three depth charges; the corvettes then opened fire at point-blank range, hitting U-556s conning tower. Her captain, Wohlfarth and the crew abandoned ship, and the boat sank before she could be secured.

In September 1941 Gladiolus was involved in the battle for SC 42. Under major attack, SC 42 lost 15 ships in two days, for the destruction of one U-boat. Numerous escorts were drafted in as reinforcement; on 11 September Gladiolus arrived with EG 2, led by Douglas. SC 42 was stalked for a further five days, losing two more ships, though the destroyers of EG 2 were able to sink another U-boat. This was, after SC 7, the worst convoy loss in the North Atlantic during the war.

In October 1941 she was part of the escort for SC 48, during which battle Gladiolus was lost.

Fate
Gladiolus was lost in October 1941 whilst escorting SC 48. At the time, she was under the command of Lieutenant Commander H. M. C. Sanders.
 
British sources record Gladiolus separated from SC 48 on the night of 15/16 October. At 2130 Empire Heron was hit, and Gladiolus was detached to chase down the attacker and search for survivors. At 2200 she signalled she had picked up one man, and was continuing to search. This was her last contact; nothing more is known of her, and there were no survivors from either vessel. It was believed that she had been sunk while picking up survivors or been lost in a marine accident.

However historian Bernard Edwards is clear that Gladiolus was lost without rejoining the convoy; while acknowledging the claim for a loss in the early hours of the 17th, he states it is more likely that she went down before that. 
 
In an interview with the BBC, former crew member Dick Turner speculated Gladiolus was unstable due to her refit, and had overturned during a violent manoeuvre.

In the absence of any conclusive explanation, the actual cause of her loss is unknown.

Notes

References

 
 
 Clay Blair : Hitler’s U-Boat War Vol I  (1996) 
 Bernard Edwards : Donitz and the Wolf Packs (1996) 
 Peter Elliott : Allied Escort Ships of World War II (1977) 
 
 Paul Kemp : U-Boats Destroyed ( 1997) .

External links
HMS Gladiolus on the Arnold Hague database at convoyweb.org.uk.
Flower Class Corvette Association ,

 

Flower-class corvettes of the Royal Navy
World War II shipwrecks in the Atlantic Ocean
1940 ships
Maritime incidents in October 1941
Ships lost with all hands
Ships sunk by German submarines in World War II